Agonopterix clemensella is a moth of the family Depressariidae. It is found in eastern North America, where it has been recorded from Arkansas, Illinois, Indiana, Kentucky, Maine, Michigan, Minnesota, Mississippi, Missouri, Ohio, Oklahoma, Ontario, Pennsylvania, Tennessee, Vermont, Virginia, West Virginia and Wisconsin. The habitat consists of damp woods and meadows.

The wingspan is about 19 mm. Adults are deep roseate with a pale purplish lustre. The wings are dusted with dark brown scales.

The larvae feed on various Umbelliferae species, including Sanicula odorata, Osmorhiza longistylis, Zizia aptera, Pastinaca sativa and Heracleum mantegazzianum. The species overwinters as an adult.

References

Moths described in 1876
Agonopterix
Moths of North America